The Massey Ferguson MF Centora is a series of models of combine harvesters made in America by Massey Ferguson.

MF Centora 7280 
The 7280 is the first in the series the header span is 6.2 meters. It is the smallest at 378 horsepower, it has a 3500-liter tank.

MF Centora 7280 Al 
The 7280 Al is almost the same as the MF Centora 7280. Apart from it has a slightly longer header.

MF centora7282 
This model has 10500 liter tank it has a longer header at 7m 7 cm.

MF Centora 7282 AL 
This Combine is almost the same as the 7282 but it has a tank the size of 9500 liters it is improved electronically.

External links 
 http://www.masseyferguson.de/mfcentora.aspx

Combine harvesters
Massey Ferguson vehicles